For the current Texas legislative body, see Texas Legislature.

The Congress of the Republic of Texas was the national legislature of the Republic of Texas established by the Constitution of the Republic of Texas in 1836.  It was a bicameral legislature based on the model of the United States Congress. It was transformed into the Texas Legislature upon annexation of Texas by the United States in 1846. A vestige of it remains in the name of Austin's main north–south street leading from the State Capitol, Congress Avenue, when it was founded as the intended national capital.

Membership and organization

House of Representatives
The House of Representatives was to be made up of 24-40 members. until such time as the population of the republic should exceed 100,000. When the population exceeded this number the house was to be made up of "not less than forty nor more than one hundred pieces provided that each county was entitled to at least one representative."

Members of the House were elected on the first Monday in September, each year and were elected to a one-year term. A member had to be twenty-five or older, a citizen of the republic, and a resident of his district for six months. The House chose its speaker and had sole power of impeachment.

Senate
The Senate was chosen by districts that were as nearly equal as possible to the population of free men ("free negroes and Indians excepted") The Senate was to have a membership numbering "not less than one-third nor more than one-half that of the House."

Senate districts were entitled to be represented by no more than one member. A senator had to be thirty or older, a citizen of the republic, and a resident of his district for one year. Senators were elected to three year terms, with one-third of the members being elected each year. The Vice President presided over the Senate, "but shall not vote on any question, unless the senate be equally divided." Beyond that, the Senate chose its own officers, including the President pro tem, and had sole responsibility to try impeachments.

General
No person holding an office of profit under the government, or who collected monies on behalf of the government was eligible to serve in the Congress.  No minister of the gospel or priest of any denomination whatever was eligible to the office of the Executive of the Republic, nor to a seat of either branch of the Congress of the same. Each house was to judge election and qualification of its own members. A quorum in either house was two-thirds of its membership. Members were to receive pay as fixed by law, but no change could be made in salary in the session in which the change was made. Since the terms of House members was one year, each Congress lasted only one year.

History of the Texas Congress
The 1st Congress of the Republic of Texas, which convened at Columbia on October 3, 1836, was made up of thirty representatives and fourteen senators. The interim vice president, Lorenzo de Zavala, served as President of the Senate until October 22, when Mirabeau B. Lamar was inaugurated as vice president and Richard Ellis was elected President pro tem of the Senate. Ira Ingram was elected Speaker of the House.

Throughout its history, the Republic of Texas had nine congresses.

Powers of the Congress
Article II of the Constitution of the Republic of Texas set forth the following powers:
 to levy and collect taxes and imposts, excise and tonnage duties; to borrow money on the faith, credit, and property of the government, to pay the debts and to provide for the common defence and general welfare of the republic.
 to regulate commerce, to coin money, to regulate the value thereof and of foreign coin, to fix the standard of weights and measures, but nothing but gold and silver shall be made a lawful tender.
 to establish post offices and post roads, to grant charters of incorporation, patents and copy rights, and secure to the authors and inventors the exclusive use thereof for a limited time.
 to declare war, grant letters of marque and reprisal, and to regulate captures.
 to provide and maintain an army and navy, and to make all laws and regulations necessary for their government.
 to call out the militia to execute the law, to suppress insurrections, and repel invasion.
 to make all laws which shall be deemed necessary and proper to carry into effect the foregoing express grants of power, and all other powers vested in the government of the republic, or in any officer or department thereof.

See also

 History of Texas
 1st Congress of the Republic of Texas, 1836–37
 Timeline of the Republic of Texas
 President of the Republic of Texas
 List of speakers of the Texas House of Representatives
 Ashworth Act
 Texas Legislature

References

 
Texas, Republic
.
Republic of Texas
Texas Legislature
1836 establishments in the Republic of Texas
1846 disestablishments in the United States
19th-century disestablishments in Texas